State Road 371 (SR 371) runs through Tallahassee as a primarily east west route. In 2018, the Florida Legislature designated the Orange Avenue section of the roadway as C.K. Steele Memorial Highway.

Its western terminus is at State Road 263/Capital Circle; it runs eastwards along Orange Avenue to Lake Bradford Road. Leaving Orange to continue eastwards as State Road 373, it turns north on Lake Bradford Road until reaching Gaines Street, then proceeds eastwards on Gaines to State Road 61/Monroe Street.

State Road 371 is an important route through Florida State University, as it passes next to Doak Campbell Stadium.

Major intersections

References

External links

371
371
Transportation in Tallahassee, Florida